{{Speciesbox
| image = 
| image2 = 
| taxon = Charaxes mafuga
| authority = van Someren, 1969 <ref>Van Someren, V.G.L. 1969. Revisional notes on African Charaxes (Lepidoptera: Nymphalidae). Part V. Bulletin of the British Museum (Natural History) (Entomology) 23: 75-166.</ref>
| synonyms = *Charaxes mafuga f. vetuloides Mollet, 1975Charaxes mafuga f. incongrua Turlin, 2011Charaxes mafuga f. venusta Turlin,  2011
}}Charaxes mafuga is a butterfly in the family Nymphalidae. It is found in south-western Uganda, Rwanda and Burundi. The habitat consists of montane forests.

The larvae feed on Albizia gummifera.

TaxonomyCharaxes mafuga is a member of the large species group Charaxes etheocles

References

Victor Gurney Logan Van Someren, 1969 Revisional notes on African Charaxes (Lepidoptera: Nymphalidae). Part V. Bulletin of the British Museum'' (Natural History) (Entomology)75-166.

External links
Charaxes mafuga images at Consortium for the Barcode of Life
Images of C. mafuga Royal Museum for Central Africa (Albertine Rift Project)

Butterflies described in 1969
mafuga